Martin Thompson may refer to:

 Martin E. Thompson (1786–1877), American architect and artist
 Martin Luther Thompson (1857–1946), Texas Choctaw leader and rancher
 Martin Thompson (New Zealand artist) (1955–2021), New Zealand geometric abstract artist

See also
 Martin Thomsen (disambiguation)